Colonsay Airport  is located on the island of Colonsay, Argyll and Bute, Scotland. Scheduled services commenced in 2006 after the grass airfield was upgraded with a paved runway.

Airline and destinations

References

Airports in Scotland
Transport in Argyll and Bute